Qianjiang Century City is a central business district under construction, located in Ningwei Street, Xiaoshan District, southeast of Qiantang River, Hangzhou, Zhejiang Province, China. The total planned area is 22.27 square kilometers and the planned population is 160,000. The core area is 9.6 square kilometers.

Century City is located in the Jiangbin area of Xiaoshan City, facing Qianjiang New City across the river. From the northwest to the Qiantang River, southwest to the Qijia Gate - Limin River, northeast to Hangzhou-Ningbo Expressway, south to the former Jiefang River, east to Liqun River and Shixin Road.

In 2003, the Management Committee of Qianjiang Century City was established. The construction started in 2008.

Economy 
By the end of April 2018, more than 5,000 enterprises had settled in Century City.

Buildings 
 Hangzhou Sports Park Stadium
 Hangzhou International Expo Center

Education 
There will be 1 senior high school, 3 junior high schools and 8 primary schools.

See also 
 Qianjiang New City
 Qianjiang Century City station

References

External links 

 

Xiaoshan District
Economy of Hangzhou